The Razzie Award for Worst Screen Combo is an award presented at the annual Golden Raspberry Awards to the worst movie pairing or cast of the past year. The following is a list of nominees and recipients of the awards, along with the film(s) for which they were nominated.

History
The category, which made its debut at the 15th Razzie ceremony, was originally named Worst Screen Couple, but in 2011 it was changed to Worst Screen Couple / Worst Screen Ensemble so entire casts could be included. This was changed again in 2012 where Screen Couple and Screen Ensemble were split and awarded separately before being changed again in 2013 to an individual award called Worst Screen Combo. The category is defined to include any combination of actors, actresses, props, or body parts.

Worst Screen Couple 1994–2009
 1994 – Tom Cruise and Brad Pitt – Interview with the Vampire (tie)
 1994 – Sylvester Stallone and Sharon Stone – The Specialist (tie)
 Any combination of two people in the entire cast – Color of Night
 Dan Aykroyd and Rosie O'Donnell – Exit to Eden
 Kevin Costner and "any of his three wives" (Annabeth Gish, Joanna Going or Mare Winningham) – Wyatt Earp
 1995 – Any combination of two people (or two body parts) – Showgirls
 William Baldwin and Cindy Crawford – Fair Game
 Tim Daly and Sean Young – Dr. Jekyll and Ms. Hyde
 Dave Foley and Julia Sweeney – It's Pat
 Demi Moore and either Robert Duvall or Gary Oldman – The Scarlet Letter
 1996 – Demi Moore and Burt Reynolds – Striptease
 Pamela Anderson's impressive enhancements – Barb Wire
 Beavis and Butt-head (voice of Mike Judge) – Beavis and Butt-head Do America
 Marlon Brando and "that darn dwarf" (Nelson de la Rosa) – The Island of Dr. Moreau
 Matt LeBlanc and Ed the mechanical monkey – Ed
 1997 – Dennis Rodman and Jean-Claude Van Damme – Double Team
 Sandra Bullock and Jason Patric – Speed 2: Cruise Control
 George Clooney and Chris O'Donnell – Batman & Robin
 Steven Seagal and his guitar – Fire Down Below
 Jon Voight and the animatronic anaconda – Anaconda
 1998 – Leonardo DiCaprio and Leonardo DiCaprio (as twins) – The Man in the Iron Mask
 Ben Affleck and Liv Tyler – Armageddon
 Any combination of two characters, body parts or fashion accessories – Spice World
 Any combination of two people playing themselves – An Alan Smithee Film: Burn Hollywood Burn
 Ralph Fiennes and Uma Thurman – The Avengers
 1999 – Kevin Kline and Will Smith – Wild Wild West
 Pierce Brosnan and Denise Richards – The World Is Not Enough
 Sean Connery and Catherine Zeta-Jones – Entrapment
 Jake Lloyd and Natalie Portman – Star Wars: Episode I – The Phantom Menace
 Lili Taylor and Catherine Zeta-Jones – The Haunting
 2000 – John Travolta and anyone sharing the screen with him – Battlefield Earth
 Any two actors – Book of Shadows: Blair Witch 2
 Richard Gere and Winona Ryder – Autumn in New York
 Madonna and either Benjamin Bratt or Rupert Everett – The Next Best Thing
 Arnold Schwarzenegger (as the real Adam Gibson) and Arnold Schwarzenegger (as the clone of Adam Gibson) – The 6th Day
 2001 – Tom Green and any animal he abuses – Freddy Got Fingered
 Ben Affleck and either Kate Beckinsale or Josh Hartnett – Pearl Harbor
 Mariah Carey's cleavage – Glitter
 Burt Reynolds and Sylvester Stallone – Driven
 Kurt Russell and either Kevin Costner or Courteney Cox – 3000 Miles to Graceland
 2002 – Adriano Giannini and Madonna – Swept Away
 Roberto Benigni and Nicoletta Braschi – Pinocchio
 Hayden Christensen and Natalie Portman – Star Wars: Episode II – Attack of the Clones
 Eddie Murphy and either Robert De Niro in Showtime, Owen Wilson in I Spy or himself cloned in The Adventures of Pluto Nash
 Britney Spears and "whatever-his-name-was" (Anson Mount) in Crossroads
 2003 – Ben Affleck and Jennifer Lopez – Gigli
 Kelly Clarkson and Justin Guarini – From Justin to Kelly
 Ashton Kutcher and either Brittany Murphy in Just Married or Tara Reid in My Boss's Daughter
 Mike Myers and either Thing One or Thing Two – The Cat in the Hat
 Eric Christian Olsen and Derek Richardson – Dumb and Dumberer: When Harry Met Lloyd
 2004 – George W. Bush and either Condoleezza Rice or his pet goat – Fahrenheit 9/11
 Ben Affleck and either Jennifer Lopez or Liv Tyler – Jersey Girl
 Halle Berry and either Benjamin Bratt or Sharon Stone – Catwoman
 Mary-Kate and Ashley Olsen – New York Minute
 Shawn and Marlon Wayans (in or out of drag) – White Chicks
 2005 – Will Ferrell and Nicole Kidman – Bewitched
 Jamie Kennedy and anybody stuck sharing the screen with him – Son of the Mask
 Jenny McCarthy and anyone dumb enough to befriend or date her – Dirty Love
 Rob Schneider and his diapers – Deuce Bigalow: European Gigolo
 Jessica Simpson and her Daisy Dukes – The Dukes of Hazzard
 2006 – Shawn Wayans and either Kerry Washington or Marlon Wayans – Little Man
 Tim Allen and Martin Short – The Santa Clause 3: The Escape Clause
 Nicolas Cage and his bear suit – The Wicker Man
 Hilary and Haylie Duff – Material Girls
 Sharon Stone's lopsided breasts – Basic Instinct 2
 2007 – Lindsay Lohan and Lindsay Lohan (as the yang to her own yin) – I Know Who Killed Me
 Jessica Alba and either Hayden Christensen in Awake, Dane Cook in Good Luck Chuck or Ioan Gruffudd in Fantastic Four: Rise of the Silver Surfer
 Any combination of two totally air-headed characters – Bratz
 Eddie Murphy (Norbit) and either Eddie Murphy (Mr. Wong) or Eddie Murphy (Rasputia) – Norbit
 Adam Sandler and either Kevin James or Jessica Biel – I Now Pronounce You Chuck and Larry
 2008 – Paris Hilton and either Christine Lakin or Joel David Moore – The Hottie and the Nottie
 Uwe Boll and "any actor, camera or screenplay"
 Cameron Diaz and Ashton Kutcher – What Happens in Vegas
 Larry the Cable Guy and Jenny McCarthy – Witless Protection
 Eddie Murphy in Eddie Murphy – Meet Dave
 2009 – Sandra Bullock and Bradley Cooper – All About Steve
 Any two (or more) Jonas Brothers – Jonas Brothers: The 3D Concert Experience
 Will Ferrell and any co-star, creature or "comic riff" – Land of the Lost
 Shia LaBeouf and either Megan Fox or any Transformer – Transformers: Revenge of the Fallen
 Kristen Stewart and either Taylor Lautner or Robert Pattinson – The Twilight Saga: New Moon

Worst Screen Couple/Worst Screen Ensemble 2010
 2010 – The entire cast of Sex and the City 2
 Jennifer Aniston and Gerard Butler – The Bounty Hunter
 Josh Brolin's face and Megan Fox's accent – Jonah Hex
The entire cast of The Last Airbender
The entire cast of The Twilight Saga: Eclipse

Worst Screen Couple 2011–2012
2011 – Adam Sandler and either Katie Holmes, Al Pacino or Adam Sandler – Jack and Jill
 Nicolas Cage and anyone sharing the screen with him – Drive Angry,  Season of the Witch,  Trespass
 Shia LaBeouf and Rosie Huntington-Whiteley – Transformers: Dark of the Moon
 Adam Sandler and either Jennifer Aniston or Brooklyn Decker – Just Go with It
 Kristen Stewart and either Taylor Lautner or Robert Pattinson – The Twilight Saga: Breaking Dawn – Part 1
 2012 – Mackenzie Foy and Taylor Lautner – The Twilight Saga: Breaking Dawn – Part 2
Any two cast members from Jersey Shore – The Three Stooges
 Robert Pattinson and Kristen Stewart – The Twilight Saga: Breaking Dawn – Part 2
 Tyler Perry and his drag get-up – Madea's Witness Protection
 Adam Sandler and either Leighton Meester, Andy Samberg or Susan Sarandon – That's My Boy

Worst Screen Ensemble 2011–2012
 2011 – The entire cast of Jack and Jill
The entire cast of Bucky Larson: Born to Be a Star
The entire cast of New Year's Eve
The entire cast of Transformers: Dark of the Moon
The entire cast of The Twilight Saga: Breaking Dawn – Part 1
 2012 – The entire cast of The Twilight Saga: Breaking Dawn – Part 2
The entire cast of Battleship
The entire cast of Madea's Witness Protection
The entire cast of The Oogieloves in the Big Balloon Adventure
The entire cast of That's My Boy

Worst Screen Combo 2013–present
 2013 – Jaden Smith and Will Smith on planet nepotism – After Earth
The entire cast of Grown Ups 2
The entire cast of Movie 43
 Lindsay Lohan and Charlie Sheen – Scary Movie 5
 Tyler Perry and either Larry the Cable Guy or that worn out wig and dress – A Madea Christmas
 2014 – Kirk Cameron and his ego – Saving Christmas
Any two robots, actors or robotic actors – Transformers: Age of Extinction
 Cameron Diaz and Jason Segel – Sex Tape
 Kellan Lutz and either his abs, his pecs, or his glutes – The Legend of Hercules
 Seth MacFarlane and Charlize Theron – A Million Ways to Die in the West
 2015 – Jamie Dornan and Dakota Johnson – Fifty Shades of Grey
 All four "Fantastics" (Jamie Bell, Michael B. Jordan, Kate Mara and Miles Teller) – Fantastic Four
 Johnny Depp and his glued-on mustache – Mortdecai
 Kevin James and either his Segway or his glued-on mustache – Paul Blart: Mall Cop 2
 Adam Sandler and any pair of his shoes – The Cobbler
 2016 – Ben Affleck and his BFF (Baddest Foe Forever) Henry Cavill in Batman v Superman: Dawn of Justice
 Any two Egyptian gods or mortals in Gods of Egypt
 Johnny Depp and his vomitously vibrant costume in Alice Through the Looking Glass
 The entire cast of once respected actors in Collateral Beauty
 Tyler Perry and that same old worn out wig in Boo! A Madea Halloween
 Ben Stiller and his BFF (Barely Funny Friend) Owen Wilson in Zoolander 2
 2017 – Any two obnoxious Emojis in The Emoji Movie
 Any combination of two characters, two sex toys or two sexual positions in Fifty Shades Darker
 Any combination of two humans, two robots or two explosions in Transformers: The Last Knight
 Johnny Depp and his worn-out drunk routine in Pirates of the Caribbean: Dead Men Tell No Tales
 Tyler Perry and either the ratty old dress or worn-out wig in Boo 2! A Madea Halloween
 2018 – Donald Trump and his self perpetuating pettiness in Death of a Nation and Fahrenheit 11/9
 Any two actors or puppets in The Happytime Murders
 Johnny Depp and his fast-fading film career in Sherlock Gnomes
 Will Ferrell and John C. Reilly in Holmes & Watson
 Kelly Preston and John Travolta in Gotti
 2019 – Any two half-feline/half-human hairballs in Cats
 Jason Derulo and his CGI-neutered "bulge" in Cats
 Tyler Perry and Tyler Perry (or Tyler Perry) in A Madea Family Funeral
 Sylvester Stallone and his impotent rage in Rambo: Last Blood
 John Travolta and any screenplay he accepts
 2020 – Rudy Giuliani and his pants zipper in Borat Subsequent Moviefilm
 Robert Downey Jr. and his utterly unconvincing "Welsh" accent in Dolittle
 Harrison Ford and that totally fake-looking CGI "dog" in The Call of the Wild
 Lauren Lapkus and David Spade in The Wrong Missy
 Adam Sandler and his grating simpleton voice in Hubie Halloween
 2021 – LeBron James and any Warner cartoon character (or Time-Warner product) he dribbles on in Space Jam: A New Legacy
 Any klutzy cast member and any lamely lyricized (or choreographed) musical number in Diana the Musical
 Jared Leto and either his 17-pound latex face, his geeky clothes or ridiculous accent in House of Gucci
 Ben Platt and any other character who acts like Platt singing 24/7 is normal in Dear Evan Hansen
 Tom and Jerry (aka Itchy & Scratchy) in Tom & Jerry the Movie
 2022 – Tom Hanks and his latex-laden face (and ludicrous accent) in Elvis
 Both real-life characters (Marilyn Monroe and John F. Kennedy) in the fallacious White House bedroom scene in Blonde
 Andrew Dominik and his issues with women in Blonde
 Machine Gun Kelly and Mod Sun in Good Mourning
 The two 365 Days sequels (365 Days: This Day and The Next 365 Days)

Multiple wins
2 wins

 Ben Affleck
 Will Smith

Multiple nominations
5 nominations

Ben Affleck

4 nominations

 Johnny Depp 
 Adam Sandler 
 Tyler Perry

3 nominations

 Will Ferrell
 Larry the Cable Guy
 Eddie Murphy
 Sylvester Stallone
 Sharon Stone
 John Travolta

2 nominations

Sandra Bullock
Nicolas Cage
 Hayden Christensen
 Kevin Costner
 Cameron Diaz
 Megan Fox
 Kevin James
 Nicole Kidman
 Ashton Kutcher
 Burt Reynolds
 Robert Pattinson
 Natalie Portman
 Shia LaBeouf
 Taylor Lautner
 Lindsay Lohan
 Jennifer Lopez
 Jenny McCarthy
 Demi Moore
 Kristen Stewart
 Will Smith 
Liv Tyler
 Shawn Wayans
 Marlon Wayans
 Owen Wilson
 Catherine Zeta-Jones

References

External links

 

Golden Raspberry Awards by category
Awards established in 1994